Jack Sheedy may refer to:

 Jack Sheedy (Australian rules footballer) (1926–2023), Australian rules footballer
 Jack Sheedy (Gaelic footballer), former Gaelic footballer
 Jack Sheedy (musician), American musician and band leader